Acalanes High School is a public secondary school located in Lafayette, California, United States, in the San Francisco Bay Area, within Contra Costa County. Acalanes was the first of four high schools established in the Acalanes Union High School District. It was built in 1940 on what was then a tomato field, using federal government funds with labor provided by the Works Project Administration, the largest and most ambitious New Deal agency introduced by the Roosevelt administration. Lafayette businessman M.H. Stanley suggested the name "Acalanes", the name of Rancho Acalanes, the Mexican grant from which all land title within the City of Lafayette derives.  Rancho Acalanes itself seems to have been named by its Hispanic settlers after the local Native American Bay Miwok tribe called Saklan (Saclan), referred to by Spanish missionaries as Saclanes. The first graduating class of 1941 selected the school colors of blue and white. For the school sports mascot, they chose the Don (a Spanish honorary title).

Academics
Acalanes offers a diverse course selection and a number of AP and honors courses. Among the electives offered are sports medicine, digital design, automechanics, studio arts from beginning to AP, video production, journalism, drama, photography, Mandarin (Chinese), Spanish, French, chorus, band (four groups), and orchestra.

Acalanes academic clubs regularly participate in Bay Area quiz bowl tournaments, including BAAL (Bay Area Academic League). Acalanes also offers Model UN and Academic Decathlon as extracurricular activities. The Acalanes Academic Decathlon team won first place in the Contra Costa regional meet in 2007, 2008, 2009, and 2010. They took first place in Division III at the 2009 California state competition.

Acalanes High demonstrated its scientific excellence in 2008, winning the regional competition of the National Science Bowl at Lawrence Berkeley National Laboratory. Acalanes finished second in the same competition in 2009. However, the school has consistently lagged behind local high schools Campolindo and Miramonte in more comprehensive rankings based on AP scores and overall academic quality. For 2013, Campolindo High School was ranked 131st in the nation by U.S. News & World Report, Miramonte was ranked 173rd, while Acalanes was ranked 275th.

Athletics

California Interscholastic Federation
North Coast Section 
Diablo Foothill Athletic League

Extracurricular activities
The award-winning school paper, Blueprint, runs eight issues each year, publishing approximately every three weeks. Blueprint won the American Scholastic Press Association's (ASPA) "Most Outstanding High School Newspaper for 2009" for a student body population of 1001-1700.

The yearbook is the AKLAN. The leadership class issues a monthly communications video with skits announcing upcoming events. On November 13, 2006, a special video was shown as a kick-off to Acalanes' diversity week, and featured a short film, Silhouettes, directed by an Acalanes student. Also screened was the documentary Invisible Children. Popular events during the school year include games, rallies, and weekly activities sponsored by the leadership class. The drama department puts on two plays each year, along with a yearly musical, a collaboration between the chorus and band departments. There are various chorus and band concerts throughout the year.

Facilities
In 1939, Acalanes was the first school designed by Ernest Kump and became the prototype for what came to be called the "California School", consisting of a complex of rectangular single-story modern buildings in parallel rows separated by gardens, with no hallways. Its openness to the outdoors and ease of expansion were revolutionary at the time, and the format was widely copied.

The campus includes a track, several fields (an astroturf field, a grass field, and a baseball field), a pool, tennis courts, two gyms, weight room, two quads, and a state-of-the-art performing arts center. Measure E bonds passed in 2008 provided for the complete renovation of the aquatic facilities, which was completed in the summer of 2011.

Notable alumni

Espen Baardsen - professional soccer goalkeeper
Nicki Bluhm -  musician
Alan Chin - artist
Philip M. Condit - former chairman and CEO of the Boeing Company
Donna de Varona - Olympian
Gloria Duffy -  former U.S. Deputy Assistant Secretary of Defense and Special Coordinator for Cooperative Threat Reduction
Scott Dyleski - Convicted of murdering his neighbor, Pamela Vitale, the wife of attorney Daniel Horowitz 
Craig Federighi - Sr. Vice President of Software Engineering at Apple
Don Ferrarese- Former MLB player (Baltimore Orioles, Cleveland Indians, Chicago White Sox, Philadelphia Phillies, St. Louis Cardinals)
Will Forte - cast member of Saturday Night Live
 Justin Fox (born 1964) - financial journalist, commentator, and writer
George Prifold Harrison - gold medalist at the 1960 Olympic Games
Peter Hayes and Robert Levon Been - members of the rock band Black Rebel Motorcycle Club
Hans-Peter Martin - member of the European Parliament, foreign exchange student
Joe Millette - Former MLB player (Philadelphia Phillies)
George Lewis Mount - member of the 1976 US Olympic cycling team
Dave Stanton - motorcycle racer, former AFM, WERA National Endurance, AMA Pro, and Formula USA champion
Cameron Tuttle - bestselling author of the Bad Girl’s Guide series 
Ross Valory - bassist for the rock band Journey
Norm Van Brocklin - NFL quarterback
Evan Wallach - judge of the United States Court of Appeals for the Federal Circuit
Kathryn Werdegar - California Supreme Court Justice

References

External links
School website

High schools in Contra Costa County, California
Lafayette, California
Public high schools in California
Educational institutions established in 1940
1940 establishments in California